Kreyol may mean:

Antillean Creole French (Kreyol)
Haitian Creole
Liberian Kreyol language (Kreyol)
Louisiana Creole French (Kréyol lwizyàn)
Guianan Creole init (French Guianan Creole)) (Kréyòl gwiyanè)
Sranan Tongo (Surinamese Creole) (Sranan Tongo)

See also
Creole language, a stable natural language that develops from the simplifying and mixing of different languages into a new one
Krio (disambiguation)
Kriol (disambiguation)
Kriolu
Dominican Creole (Kwéyòl)
Saint Lucian Creole (Kwéyòl)